Tmesisternus octopunctatus is a species of beetle in the family Cerambycidae. It was described by E. Forrest Gilmour in 1949. It is known from Papua New Guinea.

References

octopunctatus
Beetles described in 1949